The David Baldwin House is located in Midland Park, Bergen County, New Jersey, United States. The house was added to the National Register of Historic Places on January 10, 1983. The house was built in 1838.

David Baldwin was an engineer and inventor who patented various machines from the 1830s to 1870s.

See also 

 National Register of Historic Places listings in Bergen County, New Jersey

References

Houses on the National Register of Historic Places in New Jersey
Houses completed in 1838
Stone houses in New Jersey
Houses in Bergen County, New Jersey
National Register of Historic Places in Bergen County, New Jersey
Midland Park, New Jersey
New Jersey Register of Historic Places